Vadna is a village in Borsod-Abaúj-Zemplén county, Hungary.

Etymology 
The name comes from Slavic/Slovak vodná derived from voda (water). Wodna (1237—1242, falsum dated to 1237).

References

External links 
 Street map 

Populated places in Borsod-Abaúj-Zemplén County